Gulong ng Palad (International title: Stand for Love / ) is a Philippine radio drama series (1949-1956), which first aired by DZRH and soap opera hit from 1977 up to 1985 (originally aired by BBC-2, then formerly City 2 Television from 1977 to 1979 and reverted in 1983 until 1985 and RPN from 1979 to 1983). On January 9, 2006, the drama series came back in television under the direction of Eric Salud and Jerome Pobocan.

This series can be watched regularly on ABS-CBN from Monday to Friday after TV Patrol World (now TV Patrol). This show also aired simultaneously on The Filipino Channel.

This show aired from January 9, 2006, to May 12, 2006, replacing Pasko na, Game ka na ba? and was replaced by Bituing Walang Ningning.

The series was shot from June to December 2005.

Plot
Luisa the daughter of a laundrywoman and Carding, the Mayor's son, are best friends. However their friendship is disapproved by both their mothers, Menang Medel, the Mayor's wife due to her looking down on the poor and Edad, Luisa's mother who believes that all people must stand in their right place/social standing. Despite this, both children remained best friends. Upon the death of Carding's father, however, his mother, Menang, decides to take him away to the U.S. to live with her. This caused a huge blow to their family fortune as Menang does not know how to keep her husband's assets and is too proud to live below their means. Luisa and Carding promised to write to each other, but Carding doesn't fulfill his promise, leading Luisa to distrust him and become determined to stay away from him when he returned ten years later.

Mimi Sandoval, the daughter of a rich real estate developer Carmen Sandoval (who also happens to be Menang's best friend), studies at the same school Luisa is studying. Aside from being her rival in the school ranking, Mimi is also keen in winning Carding's heart. Menang Medel does approve of Mimi because of her social class and is always encouraging Carding to date her, as Carmen's wealth would benefit them. Carding however is smitten with Luisa despite their poverty. Angry with this, Mimi decides to covet Luisa her only chance of getting a scholarship by bribing their school with new computers and air conditioners. Her mother, Carmen, despite wealthy is a rational women and disapproves her actions but has to put up with Mimi as she keeps a secret- Mimi is in fact adapted as Carmen cannot bear children.

After Luisa's graduation and failed attempts for scholarship applications, Luisa's family agrees to put up a money jar to save enrollment money for her. This causes a huge rift between Luisa and her sister Nene, as it seems like the family is playing favorites with her. Nene however also has her own secrets- she despises her family and pretends to be wealthy and is also stealing money from the money jar.

When Totoy, Luisa's sickly older brother, becomes ill from too much working for Luisa's schooling, Luisa decides to forget her college dreams and work as a servant on Carmen's home to help pay for the family debt in Totoy's hospitalization. Mimi uses this as an advantage, and treats Luisa unfairly, giving her difficult chores and depriving her rest. Realizing her daughter is suffering, Edad tells Luisa to stop working as she would pay Carmen with her paycheck. When Luisa disagrees, Edad finally explodes and reveals to her family how she regretted marrying Thomas, their father, as he has promised to give them a better life. Thomas, along with some financial problems arising within their family, becomes greatly depressed, causing his already failing heart condition to worsen.

Menang realizes that her funds are running out, and decides to loan money from David, a wealthy businessman with shady activities. But Menang's extravagant life causes her to be more in debt, so David suggests she enter politics as it can help her regain her deflating bank account. Menang, with no choice, submits and files candidacy for Mayor. With no source of campaign funds she  begins to exhaust the family's remaining savings and some amount from Carding's trust deposit for her campaign, despite David's obvious embezzling.

Carding and Luisa, on the other hand, began to start a relationship, despite Menang's open disapproval, Edad's anger and Mimi's envy. Mimi on the other hand, pretends to support the two of them but is determined to ruin their relationship behind their backs. Edad, now afraid of her daughter's infiltration with the wealthy, decides to lock her up and send her away. But Carding and Luisa find ways to meet with each other. When Menang openly humiliates Edad in front of the people of Sta Lucia, this caused a huge blow to her campaign, which opted her to back out. But Carding gets into an accident and she has to resort to David to pay for their hospital bills. Carding, who falls into a coma, is tended by Luisa, who is now determined not to part with him. At the same time, a newcomer arrives in town, Diego, a handsome city boy and his sister Jojo, a tomboyish girl. Totoy is smitten with Jojo while Diego himself falls in love with Luisa.

When Carding wakes up from coma he and Luisa decides to run away. This caused a huge scandal in Santa Lucia, as Luisa is believed to be a modest woman. Menang, taking this as an opportunity towards her favor, announces that she is ready to accept Luisa as daughter in law and marries Carding to her with a lavish wedding. Edad and Totoy disowned Luisa at that very moment as they blame her for shattering their dreams of alleviating poverty. Tomas however went to the ceremony as he knew his days are numbered, his heart condition a secret in an attempt to not burden his family with his severe health problem.

After Luisa marry Carding life becomes even harder for her. Her mother has not forgiven her, Carding goes off to Manila for college leaving her in the evil hands of Menang, who controls all her actions. Menang's plan is to make Luisa look bad in front of all people and Carding, so that he will leave her and the devastated Mimi can take her chance. After having enough of Menang Luisa finally stands up for herself, but this causes more and more problems for her family. Both Tomas and Totoy lose their jobs, her youngest brother Peping got nearly kidnapped by men hired by Menang. The job loss caused Tomas to have a heart attack on his way home, and he is ran over by an oncoming train. Luisa finally decides to get even by exposing Menang's lies and schemes. Carding, who is a Mama's boy, becomes stuck between the important women in his life and doesn't know whom to believe. He finally turns to Mimi who uses his vulnerability to her advantage. Mimi finally sees this as a chance to get Carding, meanwhile Diego admits his adoration for Luisa. He helps Luisa earn money for her family by sending her embroideries. Menang however accuses Luisa of stealing, and talks Carding into it.

Believing his married life in trouble, Carding has a drunken night out with Mimi, who finally got her way with him. Carding feels guilty about sleeping with Mimi and avoids going home to face Luisa. Menang uses this to turn him against his wife by saying that Luisa is having an affair with Diego. Luisa decides to leave the Medel household and reconcile with her family. Edad, Totoy and Nene finally forgive her, and during a rally, they publicly reveal Menang's meddling with her father's death. Menang retaliates by throwing insults to the poor, calling them gold digging scums. When the people of Santa Lucia hear this, they turn their support away from Menang, causing her to lose the Mayor position.

Diego, believing that Carding has left Luisa, tries to win her affections by looking after her and her family. When she rejects him, he tries to rape her. He goes to prison for his crime, but a fight inside the jail causes him to be stabbed. Luisa realizes she is pregnant and informs Carding, who decides to forget all their problems behind and start afresh with her. Mimi, however, goes to Diego in his deathbed to offer him cash in return to deceiving Carding by falsely admitting that he and Luisa have an illicit relationship and that the child she is carrying is his. Carding, brainwashed by both Mimi and Menang, believes these falsehoods and leaves the devastated Luisa. Luckily, Jojo had read a letter from Diego himself before his death, saying that he and Luisa didn't have an affair and in fact, Mimi told him to tell this rumor  to Carding in order to ruin Luisa's reputation and she'd win his (Carding's) heart in exchange for money, which is to be left for Jojo's future. She tries to tell Luisa, but Mimi hires people to end her. Alex, Carding's cousin, nearly sideswipes Luisa and is also blackmailed by Mimi and decides to help Jojo get her revenge with Mimi.

Menang realizes that she is now penniless and  destitute after not winning the elections, and when the debts become too high she commits arson by burning their mansion down to gain insurance money which amounts to 20 million pesos. But the fire found to be intentional and Menang not only loses her house, but also her beauty as she gets disfigured. With no one else to turn to as all their rich friends and colleagues had forsaken them, Carding and Menang take refuge under  Luisa's roof, but Edad drives the two of them afterwards due to Carding accusing Luisa of infidelity and Menang openly disrespecting Luisa. Luisa finally gets to her senses and leaves her husband and mother- in- law to themselves. Mimi gets this opportunity to win Carding's favor by giving them money to start over. But Menang's proud lifestyle caused it to ran out. Menang tries to resort to illegal activities to try to earn back her wealth but she is caught with a warning. Finally realizing that they have no means to buy food other than to earn it, Carding stops grieving his failed marriage and tries his luck applying for work. But his unfinished schooling caused him to be employed as a waiter, and due to his upbringing, he suffers greatly as he is not used to labor.

Soon enough, Totoy goes to the city to try his luck and is helped by a wealthy lady in building his own cafe which transforms his family's situation dramatically. Mimi pretends that she is pregnant but when her mother finds out she cuts her off financially until she decides to go back with her to America. Caridng briefly has a relationshio with her until it is discovered that she is faking her pregnancy and both Carding and 
Menang throws her out. Carding and Menang began to experience a miserable life filled with remorse for what they have done to Luisa while Luisa and her family, who is now in comfortable circumstances thanks to Totoy, leaves Santa Lucia to start over in Manila. Luisa, having gotten enough of her husband, decides to leave him with Mimi and give up their marriage, without knowing that Carding left Mimi to get back with her.

Carding finally realizes how much he loves Luisa but is ashamed about the way he treated her. Mother and son are both evicted from their apartment due to not paying rent and  Menang is humiliated by everyone around her and finally learns humility. Carding and Menang decides to follow Luisa and her family to Manila to patch things up. Menang also advices Carding to forget Luisa and start anew as she was living a much better life without them and they would only cause her troubles.

Luisa and her family finds Menang in the streets while they are attending church service and invites her to live with them. Menang finally tearfully asks for forgiveness for everything she has done. Carding, still ashamed of everything, watches from afar as he still feels guilty for the way he had treated Luisa.
 
Mimi, after losing her mind gets jailed for her schemes towards Jojo and Alex. She is bailed by her mother but she does not give uo easily. Mimi trespasses on Luisa's house in Manila and tries to kill her but fails as Carding comes to save Luisa. She turns on Carding and knocks him unconscious before tying him up inside her car, determined to take him as her possession. Carding however manages to escape and Mimi crashes her car causing both of her legs to be amputated.

In the end, Mimi is incarcerated as an amputee and her cell mates abuse her endlessly while Carmen, having enough of Mimi's wickedness, leaves her on her own. Totoy's successful restaurant business expands into chains and is now building a mansion in Santa Lucia. Menang learns the art of humility and kindness and Idad finally gets what she has always been wishing- a good life for her family. Luisa and Carding make amends with each other and raise their daughter together. Jojo finally behaves like a girl and starts dating Totoy. Luisa affirms that life has its ups and downs but in the end, it always teaches a lesson to be a better human being.

Cast and characters

Main cast (ABS-CBN) 
Kristine Hermosa as Luisa Santos-Medel - The eldest daughter of the Santos family. As the eldest of a family of four, Luisa has always been a very loving, kind and caring person. Due to her family's high expectations of her as she is regarded as their only hope to bring them out of poverty, she excelled academically in high school with the hopes of becoming valedictorian and obtaining a scholarship but was unable to do so due to Mimi providing their school computers in an attempt to be the valedictorian. Despite this, Luisa remains hopeful and promises to provide for her family. She falls in love with her childhood friend, Carding. At the end of the series, it is revealed that Luisa has given birth to a girl.
TJ Trinidad as Ricardo "Carding" Medel - He is the only child and son of the Medel family. Upon the death of his father, both he and his mother relocate to the U.S. Despite growing up in a prominent and wealthy family, Carding is a humble and caring individual, who as a child, befriends Luisa who becomes his best friend and later on his wife. Due to financial struggles that are kept hidden by his mother, he returns to Santa Lucia and attends university in Manila. He finally reconnects with Luisa and falls in love with her. He becomes involved in a head on collision after being rejected by Luisa and whilst in a coma, Luisa declares her feelings for him which later on, starts the beginning of their relationship. As the series progresses, married life for Carding and Luisa becomes challenging and by the end, Carding and Luisa both declare their love for each other and finally reunite. Carding shares a daughter with Luisa.
Cherie Gil as Philomena "Menang" Medel - Carding's mother and a wealthy socialite. Menang despises poor people, seeing them as gold diggers and doesn't approve Carding on dating Luisa. Menang is encouraging Carding to date Mimi as their marriage will help boast her campaign for mayor. In the end, Menang attempted to burn her house down to get the insurance money, but was discovered and was left homeless and injured, Menang began experiencing the poor life and began to realize the error of her ways. She asked Luisa's family for forgiveness and they accepted, even allowing her to live with them. She is the grandmother of Carding and Luisa's child.
Andrea del Rosario as Mimi Sandoval - A girl coming from a wealthy family, Mimi is deeply infatuated with Carding and is extremely jealous of Luisa. Despite Luisa being selected as the valedictorian, Mimi ultimately  becomes her school's valedictorian by using her wealth for providing computers for her school. As the series progresses, Mimi has become a deranged psychopath and is willing to resort to murder, blackmails, and manipulation in order to accomplish her tasks. She was later discovered and was arrested for her crimes, she was later bailed out by her mother Carmen. Mimi is set out to finish what she started, killing Luisa. She sneaked into Jojo's house and knock her unconscious and acquires the address to Luisa's place. She sneaked into her house and attempts to kill her but Carding subdues Mimi and saves Luisa, just as he is about to take Luisa to the hospital and call 911, Mimi knocks him unconscious with a tire iron. Mimi attempts to kill herself and Carding, seeing that if she can't have him [even his family's wealth] then no one will, but they were involved in an accident which results Mimi losing her legs. Mimi was arrested yet again for attempting murder and was sentenced to life imprisonment. Mimi's mother Carmen can only watch as her daughter is being abused by the female inmates.

Supporting cast 
Rio Locsin as Caridad "Idad" Santos
Joel Torre as Tomas Santos
Luis Alandy as Diego Morales
Joross Gamboa as Totoy Santos
Roxanne Guinoo as Josefina "Jojo" Morales
Hazel Ann Mendoza as Nene Santos
Oliver Aquino as Mark Sandoval
Nash Aguas as Peping Santos

Extended and guest cast 
Tuesday Vargas as Saling
Racquel Villavicencio as Carmen Sandoval
Lito Pimentel as David
Ahron Villena as Japoy
Amy Perez as Lorraine Pineda
Rico Barrera as Alex Trinidad
Denise Joaquin as Wendy
Mishella Angela Maravilla as Chelsea
Mosang as Belen
Emma Villanueva as Tekla
Gigi Locsin as Doray
Benjie Felipe as Banjo
Gian Carlo Terry as Butch
Jeremiah Rosales as Makoy
Khaycee Aboloc as Gwen
Juan Rodrigo as Juancho Medel
Kathryn Bernardo as Young Mimi
Phytos Ramirez as Young Carding
Alexis Ramos as Young Saling
Reggie Curley as Gary
Maureen Larrazabal as Khyna
Louissa Pressman as Luisa about age 5
Yassi Pressman as Luisa about age 11

Season 1 Episodes

Week 2

Week 3

Week 4

Week 5

Week 6

Week 7

Week 8

Week 8

Soundtracks
Gulong ng Palad - main theme song (performed by Jerome Sala)
Hindi Ko Kayang Iwan Ka / Sa Piling Mo (performed by Sheryn Regis)
Kay Palad Mo (performed by Michelle Ayalde)
Dahil Mahal na Mahal Kita (performed by Rachelle Ann Go)

See also
List of ABS-CBN drama series
List of programs broadcast by ABS-CBN

References

External links
Telebisyon.net

2006 Philippine television series debuts
2006 Philippine television series endings
ABS-CBN drama series
Television series by Dreamscape Entertainment Television
Filipino-language television shows
Television shows set in the Philippines
Television series revived after cancellation